Anonymus is the Latin spelling of anonymous, traditionally used by scholars in the humanities for any ancient writer whose name is not known, or to a manuscript of their work. Such writers have left valuable historical or literary records through the ages.

Anonymus may also refer to:

Authors
 Two separate writers both known as Anonymus Valesianus or Anonymus Valesii, authors of two texts, late fifth century and ca. 527 of a vita of Constantine and a fragmentary chronicle, the Excerpta Valesiana
 The Anonymus of Ravenna (Anonymus Ravennatis), author of the Ravenna Cosmography, a Late Antique geographical work
 The Anonymus (notary of Béla III) of the Gesta Hungarorum, the author of a medieval work on the history of Hungary
 Gallus Anonymus, early 12th century, the author of the first history of Poland
 The Anonymus of Turin (often referred to by the Italian Anonimo di Torino), writer of a catalogue of churches of Rome
 The Anonymus Banduri, the author of the Πάτρια Κωνσταντινοπόλεως, a 10th‑century topography of Constantinople
 The Anonymus de Rebus Bellicis, author of a Late Antique work on warfare
 The Anonymus Ανταττικιστης (the Anti-Atticist Anonymus), an opponent of Phrynichus Arabius, valuable for the study of ancient Greek vocabulary
 The Anonymus Seguerianus, of the 3rd century, whose work is useful for the study of 1st century rhetoric
 The Anonymus Gestorum Francorum, author of the Gesta Francorum, an account of the First Crusade
 The Anonymus of York (or The Norman Anonymous), author of an 11th‑century religious/political tract on the right of kings
 The Anonymus of Dubrovnik, author of 15th‑century Annals of that city
 Anonymus I and Anonymus II, the authors of commentaries on the Phaenomena of Aratus

Manuscript copyists
 Sometimes Anonymus refers not to an author, but to a manuscript copyist. Few manuscripts were signed, so the list might be extended almost indefinitely, but some manuscripts can be said to have transferred some of their importance to the copyist; in the manuscript tradition of Phaedrus, for example, it is common to refer to the Anonymus Nilanti, a 13th-century copyist named after the scholar who edited him in 1709.
 An Anonymus de antiquitate Urbis, stated by Christian Hülsen to be a copyist of the Roma Instaurata of Flavio Biondo

Other
 Anonymus (band), a Quebec Thrash metal band
 Anonymus, the earliest ancestor of fictional character Ijon Tichy
 Anonymus and Anonymus II, instrumentals by Focus from, respectively, In and Out of Focus and Focus 3

See also
 Anon (disambiguation)
 Anonymous (disambiguation)

Ancient writers